{{Speciesbox
|image         = Alocasia heterophylla (Philippines) 0003.jpg
|image_caption = Alocasia heterophylla in the Philippines
|genus = Alocasia
|species =  heterophylla
|authority = (C.Presl) Merr.
|synonyms_ref=<ref name="powo">{{cite web |title=Alocasia heterophylla'[' (C.Presl) Merr. |url=https://powo.science.kew.org/taxon/urn:lsid:ipni.org:names:84179-1 |website=Plants of the World Online |publisher=Royal Botanic Gardens Kew |access-date=4 February 2022}}</ref>
|synonyms=Alocasia manilensis Engl.Alocasia warburgii Engl.Caladium heterophyllum C.PreslColocasia heterophylla (C.Presl) Kunth
}}Alocasia heterophylla is a plant in the family Araceae. It is endemic to the islands of Luzon, Mindanao, and Polillo in the Philippines.

It usually bears around 3 to 5 leaves. The leaves, like its specific name implies, are highly variable in shape, even in one individual. They are usually triangular, sagittate (arrow-shaped), to hastate (spear-shaped). The leaf attachment can be deeply peltate (the inner margins of  the back lobes are fused together behind the petiole attachment), shallowly peltate, or non-peltate. The leaf margins are entire or shallowly sinuate (wavy).A. heterophylla is very similar to Alocasia ramosii and Alocasia boyceana, which are also endemic to the Philippines and are all grouped with A. heterophylla under the "Heterophylla Group" of the genus Alocasia. It can be distinguished from the other two by having fewer primary lateral veins (3 to 4) that curve towards the distal end of the leaf, the widely separated secondary veins, a gradually constricting spathe, and a conspicuously broader submarginal vein at the leaf margins. Both A. ramosii and A. boyceana are also always non-peltate, while A. heterophylla can sometimes have peltate leaves in mature specimens.

HabitatAlocasia heterophylla are restricted to limestone-rich areas of the islands of Luzon, Mindanao, and Polillo.

See alsoAlocasia sanderianaAlocasia micholitzianaAlocasia nycterisAlocasia sinuataAlocasia zebrina''

References

External links
How to Grow & Care For Alocasia Polly?

heterophylla
Endemic flora of the Philippines
Flora of Luzon
Flora of Mindanao
Garden plants of Asia
House plants
Plants described in 1908